Zinc finger protein 398 is a protein that in humans is encoded by the ZNF398 gene.

Function
This gene encodes a member of the Kruppel family of C2H2-type zinc-finger transcription factor proteins. The encoded protein acts as a transcriptional activator. Two transcript variants encoding distinct isoforms have been identified for this gene. Other transcript variants have been described, but their full length sequence has not been determined.

References

Further reading 

Human proteins